Vladimir Vujović (Serbian Cyrillic: Владимир Вујовић; born 20 December 1985) is a Serbian professional footballer who plays as a forward for Milton SC.

Playing career 
Vujović began his career in 2003 in the Belgrade Zone League with FK IMT. He played in the Serbian First League in 2008 with FK Sevojno. During his tenure with Sevojno the club were finalist in the 2008–09 Serbian Cup, and as a result qualified for the Europa League. He featured in the 2009–10 UEFA Europa League against FBK Kaunas, and Lille OSC. In 2010, Sevojno merged with FK Sloboda Užice, and played in the Serbian SuperLiga.

During his journeyman career, Vujović represented numerous clubs in the Serbian SuperLiga, which included Jagodina, Metalac Gornji Milanovac, and, Novi Pazar. While during his time in the Serbian First League he played with FK Bežanija, FK Timok, Sloga Kraljevo, and OFK Odžaci. He also spent one year abroad with Burlington SC in the Canadian Soccer League, scoring 12 goals from 18 games in the 2015 season. After a season abroad he returned to Serbia to play in the Serbian League West, and Belgrade Zone League with PKB Padinska Skela, and FK Šumadija Aranđelovac.

In 2018, he returned to the CSL to play with Milton SC.

Honours
Sevojno
 Serbian Cup: Runner-up 2008–09

References

External links
 Srbijafudbal profile
 
 

Association football forwards
Canadian Soccer League (1998–present) players
Expatriate soccer players in Canada
FK Bežanija players
FK Jagodina players
FK Metalac Gornji Milanovac players
FK Novi Pazar players
FK Sevojno players
FK Sloboda Užice players
FK Sloga Kraljevo players
FK Timok players
Milton SC players
Serbian expatriate footballers
Serbian expatriate sportspeople in Canada
Serbian First League players
Serbian footballers
Serbian SuperLiga players
Footballers from Belgrade
1985 births
Living people
Halton United players
Serbian League players